Intelligent Music Project is a Bulgarian supergroup founded in 2012 by Bulgarian businessman Milen Vrabevski. They represented Bulgaria at the Eurovision Song Contest 2022 with their song "Intention", but failed to qualify from the semi-final on 10 May.

History 
The supergroup was founded by businessman Milen Vrabevski and has featured musicians like, Simon Phillips, John Payne, Carl Sentance, Bobby Rondinelli and Todd Sucherman. They released their debut album in 2012, and have since then being releasing music and touring. Their current lead singer is the Chilean rock vocalist Ronnie Romero (Rainbow, Michael Schenker Group).

In November 2021, it was revealed by BNT that they were selected to represent the nation in Eurovision Song Contest 2022 in Turin. Their entry, "Intention", was released on December 5, being the first of the season to be published. The group consists of vocalist Ronnie Romero, Bisser Ivanov, Slavin Slavcev, Ivo Stefanov, Dimitar Sirakov and Stoyan Yankulov. Yankulov has already represented Bulgaria in 2007 and 2013.

Band members 
Current members

 Ronnie Romero – vocals
 Borislav Mudolov-Kosatkata – backing vocals
 Slavin Slavchev – backing vocals
 Lina Nicole – backing vocals
 Stoyan Yankulov-Stundzhi – drums
 Biser Ivanov – guitar
 Dimitar Sirakov – bass
 Ivo Stefanov – keyboard
 Samuel Eftimov – keyboard

Former members

 Simon Phillips
 John Lawton
 Joseph Williams
 John Payne
 Carl Sentance
 Bobby Rondinelli
 Todd Sucherman
 Nathan East
 Tim Pierce
 Richard Grisman

Discography

Studio Albums
 2012 – The Power of Mind
 2014 – My Kind o' Lovin'''
 2015 – Touching the Divine 2018 – Sorcery Inside 2020 – Life Motion 2021 – The Creation''
 2022 – Unconditioned

Singles 
 2020 – "Every Time"
 2020 – "I Know"
 2021 – "Listen"
 2021 – "Sometimes & Yesterdays That Mattered"
 2021 – "Intention"
 2022 – "New Hero"

References 

Bulgarian musical groups
Musical groups established in 2012
2012 establishments in Bulgaria
Eurovision Song Contest entrants for Bulgaria
Eurovision Song Contest entrants of 2022